Spendthrift (foaled 1876 in Kentucky – 21 October 1900) was a successful American Thoroughbred racehorse and an outstanding sire.

Breeding
Bred by A. J. Alexander and foaled at his Woodburn Stud, he was sired by the English-bred stallion, Australian, who was in turn the son of West Australian, England's first Triple Crown winner, out of Aerolite by Lexington. He was a brother to Fellowcraft and half brother to Addie C. (the dam of the 1894 Kentucky Derby winner Chant (by Falsetto). They were from the old American family number, A3.

Spendthrift was bought by Daniel Swigert for $1,000 (equal to about $,000 today) at the Woodburn yearling sale and named for Swigert's wife's extravagant spending habits in New York.

Racing record
The widely respected African-American trainer and future U.S. Racing Hall of Fame inductee Edward Brown race conditioned the two-year-old Spendthrift for Daniel Swigert. After leading the colt through an undefeated year that would retrospectively see him named the American Co-Champion Two-Year-Old Colt of 1878, he was then sold to James R. Keene for $15,000 (based on inflation only equal to about $,000 today).

At three, trained for his new owner by Col. Thomas Puryear, Spendthrift was sent east; finishing second to a stablemate in the Withers Stakes before going on to easily win the 1879 Belmont Stakes.  He then won the Jersey Derby despite being kicked at the start.

In 1880, Spendthrift was one of a group of horses, which included Lord Murphy and Foxhall, that were sent by Keene to be trained in England.

Spendthrift was retired as a five-year-old to the farm of William Kenney near Lexington, Kentucky. In all, his record stands as 16 starts, with 9 wins and 5 places.

Stud record
He was sold by Keene in 1884 and spent some time first at Dr. E. M. Norwood's farm near Lexington, then Hartland Stud, then Spendthrift Stud, before ending up at Overton Chenault's farm.

Some of his outstanding progeny were
 Bankrupt-won 86 races from 348 starts
 Hastings-leading sire and sire of Fair Play (three times leading sire and sire of Man o' War and Chance Play).
Kingston-had 138 starts and won a record 89 races, including 30 stakes-races, scoring the most victories of any Thoroughbred racehorse on record, for $139,652.
 Lamplighter-won multiple stakes, successful sire

Spendthrift-died of old age at 24, on October 21, 1900.

Pedigree

See also
List of leading Thoroughbred racehorses

References

External links
 TB Heritage: Spendthrift

1876 racehorse births
1900 racehorse deaths
Racehorses bred in Kentucky
Racehorses trained in the United States
American Champion racehorses
Belmont Stakes winners
United States Champion Thoroughbred Sires
Thoroughbred family A3
Godolphin Arabian sire line